Achutan Ramachandran Nair, popularly known as A. Ramachandran, is an Indian painter, born in 1935 in Attingal, Kerala. In 2002, he was elected a Fellow of the Lalit Kala Akademi and in 2005, he was awarded the Padma Bhushan, India's third highest civilian honour, for outstanding service to the nation. In 2013, he was conferred with an honorary doctorate by Mahatma Gandhi University, Kerala.

Career

In 1957, he obtained his master's degree in Malayalam literature, but art had remained a continuing interest since childhood. He joined Kala Bhavan, Santiniketan and completed his education in art in 1961 studying under masters like Ramkinkar Baij, and Benode Behari Mukherjee. Between 1961 and 1964, he did his doctoral thesis on Kerala mural painting. By the mid-60s, he had moved to Delhi and in 1965 he joined Jamia Millia Islamia as a lecturer in art education. Later, he became a professor in the same department and was attached to the university until his voluntary retirement in 1992. In 1991, he was appointed honorary chairman of Kerala Lalithakala Akademi, and in 2005 became Professor Emeritus at Jamia Millia Islamia University.

Ramachandran lives and works in New Delhi. He is married to artist Tan Yuan Chameli, daughter of Tan Yun-Shan.

Work

Initially, Ramachandran painted in an expressionist style which poignantly reflected the angst of urban life. The paintings were large, akin to murals, and comprised powerful figuration. By the 1980s however, Ramachandran's work underwent a sea-change. Urban reality was no longer a preoccupation. A tribal community in Rajasthan with its vibrant ethos gripped his imagination. Simultaneously, the colours and forms of the murals in the Kerala temples began to influence his mode of expression. Myths became a great resource for him. The first in this new style was ‘Yayati’, a retelling of this story from the Indian epic Mahabharata. It was conceived as the inner shrine of a Kerala temple, with thirteen bronze sculptures surrounded on three sides by painted murals, 60 by 8 feet in total size.

As a painter, his strong command over lines, colours and forms create an exciting visual drama. Ramachandran's canvases are vibrant with a sense of teeming, burgeoning life. The artist's quirky sense of irony imbues his paintings with a piquancy and feeling of new discoveries. And, as one who considered Ramkinkar Baij as his guru, Ramachandran has created sculptures which are even more intriguing in formal terms than his paintings.

He designed the granite bas-relief sculpture at the Rajiv Gandhi Memorial at Sriperumbudur, near Chennai, Tamil Nadu, completed in 2003. It extends for 125 feet and has a height of nearly 20 feet.

Publications

In 2003, the National Gallery of Modern Art (New Delhi) organized a major retrospective of his work. A comprehensive two-volume book ‘A Ramachandran: A Retrospective’ (by Prof. Siva Kumar) documenting and analyzing his works was released simultaneously.

Ramachandran is the author of an extensive study on Kerala temple murals (‘Abode of Gods: Mural Traditions of Kerala’). He has also written many articles in English which have been translated into many languages including Japanese and his mother tongue Malayalam. A collection of his articles in Malayalam, Aannottam (Male Gaze), translated by P Sudhakaran, was recently published by Kairali Books, Kannur, Kerala. Ramachandran has also published a couple of books in Malayalam.

Ramachandran has also written and illustrated numerous picture books for children published in India, Japan, Britain and the United States, for which he received the Noma Concours Awards of 1978 and 1980. Some of the original illustrations from these books are on permanent display at the Museum of Children's Books at Miyazaki, Japan.

Selected books and documentaries on A. Ramachandran

Ramachandran: Art of the Muralist, Rupika Chawla, A Kala Yatra /Sista's Publication, 1994
Ramachandran, Icons of the Raw Earth, Rupika Chawla, A Kala Yatra Publication, 1998
The Art of A Ramachandran, Ella Dutta, Pocket Art Series, Roli Books, 2000
Ramachandrante Kala (in Malayalam), P. Surendran, Kala Yatra Publication, 2001. Won the Kerala Lalita Kala Akademi's first award for art criticism.
A Ramachandran: A Retrospective, R. Siva Kumar, National Gallery of Modern Art and Vadehra Art Gallery, Vols. I & II, 2003
World of the Lotus Pond, documentary feature by K. Vikram Singh, 2004

References

External links
"A Ramachandran Profile, Interview and Artworks"
Art of A. Ramachandran
20th Century Museum of Contemporary Indian Art: A. Ramachandran
Children's Books by A. Ramachandran

20th-century Indian painters
Indian children's book illustrators
Living people
1935 births
Recipients of the Padma Bhushan in arts
Fellows of the Lalit Kala Akademi
University College Thiruvananthapuram alumni
Painters from Kerala
Academic staff of Jamia Millia Islamia
Visva-Bharati University alumni
People from Thiruvananthapuram district